The First Aliyah (Hebrew: העלייה הראשונה, HaAliyah HaRishona), also known as the agriculture Aliyah, was a major wave of Jewish immigration (aliyah) to Ottoman Syria between 1881 and 1903. Jews who migrated in this wave came mostly from Eastern Europe and from Yemen. An estimated 25,000 Jews immigrated. Many of the European Jewish immigrants during the late 19th-early 20th century period gave up after a few months and went back to their country of origin, often suffering from hunger and disease. 

Because there had been a wave of immigration to Palestine starting in the mid-19th century (between 1840 and 1880, the Jewish population rose from 9,000 to 23,000), use of the term "First Aliyah" is controversial. Nearly all of the Jews from Eastern Europe before that time came from traditional Jewish families who were not inspired by modern Zionist ideology, but rather by traditional ideas of the holiness of the land combined with practical / economic considerations.

History
The First Aliyah occurred from 1881 to 1903 and did not go as planned as Zionists ran out of funds. The Rothschild organization rescued the Zionist movement by funding Zionists and by purchasing large settlements and by creating new settlements. 

The first central committee for the settlement was established by a convention of "Unions for the Agricultural Settlement of Israel" held on January 11, 1882, in Romania. It arranged passage to Israel aboard ships operating out of Galați.

After the first wave in the early 1880s, there was another spike in 1890.  The Russian Empire officially approved the activity of Hovevei Zion in 1890. The same year, the "Odessa Committee" began its operation in Jaffa. The purpose of this organization was to absorb immigrants to Ottoman Syria who came as a result of the activities of Hovevei Zion in Russia.  Also Russian Jewry's situation deteriorated as the authorities continued to push Jews out of business and trade and Moscow was almost entirely cleansed of Jews.

The relationship of the members of the First Aliyah with the Old Yishuv was strained.  There were disagreements about economic and ideological issues. Only a few groups from the Old Yishuv sought to take part in the First Aliyah's settlement effort, one such group being the Peace of Jerusalem (Shlom Yerushalayim).

Israeli historian Benny Morris wrote:
But the major cause of tension and violence throughout the period 1882–1914 was not accidents, misunderstandings or the attitudes and behaviors of either side, but objective historical conditions and the conflicting interests and goals of the two populations. The Arabs sought instinctively to retain the Arab and Muslim character of the region and to maintain their position as its rightful inhabitants; the Zionists sought radically to change the status quo, buy as much land as possible, settle on it, and eventually turn an Arab-populated country into a Jewish homeland.For decades the Zionists tried to camouflage their real aspirations, for fear of angering the authorities and the Arabs. They were, however, certain of their aims and of the means needed to achieve them. Internal correspondence amongst the olim from the very beginning of the Zionist enterprise leaves little room for doubt.

From Eastern Europe
Jewish immigration to Ottoman Palestine from Eastern Europe occurred as part of mass emigrations of approximately 2.5 million people that took place towards the end of the 19th and beginning of the 20th century.  A rapid increase in population had created economic problems that affected Jewish societies in the Pale of Settlement in Russia, Galicia, and Romania.

Persecution of Jews in Russia was also a factor.  In 1881, Tsar Alexander II of Russia was assassinated, and the authorities blamed the Jews for the assassination. Consequently, in addition to the May Laws, major anti-Jewish pogroms swept the Pale of Settlement. A movement called Hibbat Zion (love of Zion) spread across the Pale (helped by Leon Pinsker's pamphlet Auto-Emancipation), as did the similar Bilu movement. Both movements encouraged Jews to emigrate to Ottoman Palestine.

From Yemen
The first group of immigrants from Yemen came approximately seven months before most of the Eastern European Jews arrived in Palestine.

Due to the changes in the Ottoman Empire, citizens could move more freely, and in 1869, travel was improved with the opening of the Suez Canal, which reduced the travel time from Yemen to Ottoman Syria. Certain Yemenite Jews interpreted these changes and the new developments in the "Holy Land" as heavenly signs that the time of redemption was near. By settling in Ottoman Syria, they would play a part in what they believed could precipitate the anticipated messianic era. Emigration from Yemen to the Mutasarrifate of Jerusalem (Ottoman Syria) began in early 1881 and continued almost without interruption until 1914. It was during this time that about 10% of the Yemenite Jews left. From 1881 to 1882, a few hundred Jews left Sanaa and several nearby settlements. This wave was followed by other Jews from central Yemen who continued to move into Ottoman Syrian provinces until 1914. The majority of these groups moved into Jerusalem and Jaffa. In 1884, some families settled into a new-built neighborhood called Yemenite Village Kfar Hashiloach in the Jerusalem district of Silwan, and built the Old Yemenite Synagogue.

Before World War I, there was another wave that began in 1906 and continued until 1914. Hundreds of Yemenite Jews made their way to Ottoman Syria and chose to settle in the agricultural settlements. It was after these movements that the World Zionist Organization sent Shmuel Yavne'eli to Yemen to encourage Jews to emigrate to the Land of Israel. Yavne'eli reached Yemen at the beginning of 1911 and returned to Ottoman Syria in April 1912. Due to Yavne'eli's efforts, about 1,000 Jews left central and southern Yemen, with several hundred more arriving before 1914.

Settlement

The First Aliyah laid the cornerstone for Jewish settlement in Israel and created several settlements – Rishon LeZion, Rosh Pinna, Zikhron Ya'akov, Gedera, among others.  Immigrants of the First Aliyah also contributed to existing Jewish towns and settlements, notably Petah Tikva. The first neighbourhoods of Tel Aviv (Neve Tzedek, 1887; and Neve Shalom, 1890) were also built by members of the aliyah, although it was not until the Second Aliyah that Tel Aviv was officially founded.
 
The settlements established by the First Aliyah, known in Hebrew as moshavot are:

References

Citations

Sources

Further reading

Ben-Gurion, David (1976), From Class to Nation: Reflections on the Vocation and Mission of the Labor Movement, Am Oved 

First
Jews and Judaism in Europe
Jews and Judaism in Yemen
Jews and Judaism in Ottoman Palestine
1882 in Ottoman Syria
Political movements of the Ottoman Empire
Jews and Judaism in Ottoman Galilee